Raha Rastifard, born February 1, 1974, in Iran, is an Iranian-German contemporary visual artist living in Stockholm, Sweden.

Biography 
Raha Rastifard is an Iranian-German conceptual artist living in Stockholm. Rastifard works in various disciplines, from painting to video art, photography, drawings, installations, sculptures and public art.

Rastifard has exhibited in several European cities, including the Victoria and Albert Museum in London in connection with her nomination for the Freedom to Create Prize and the Pergamon Museum in Berlin. Rastifard has also exhibited in New York, Tokyo, Delhi and Shanghai. The Borås Konstmuseum installed a permanent exhibit of her work in 2022.

Public art 
 A Tribute to Movement, Public Art in Norsborg Metro Station, 2017, Stockholm, Sweden
  The Aurora, Norrbyskolan, 2017, Örebro, Sweden
 The Hanging Lotus Garden, Danderyds Hospital, 2019, Stockholm, Sweden
 Fifth Element, 2020, Östergötland Museum, Linköping, Sweden

References

External links 
 Official website Raha Rastifard
 Raha Rastifard on the design The hanging lotus garden at Danderyds Hospital, 2019-07-24, Cultural Administration Region Stockholm
 Raha Rastifard: A story written with water (YouTube). 24 September 2016. The Parlor.

1974 births
Living people
German women artists
Iranian women artists
Swedish women artists
Stockholm-related lists